The House at 380 Albion Street in Wakefield, Massachusetts is one of the finest Bungalow/Craftsman style houses in the town.  It was built c. 1910 in a then-rural part of Wakefield that been annexed from Stoneham in the 1880s.  The house was listed on the National Register of Historic Places in 1989.

Description and history
Albion Street is a major local thoroughfare, running southwest from the center of Wakefield to the north side of Stoneham center.  Number 380 is set on a parcel under  in size that abuts the present town line at the Green Street intersection.  The parcel is fringed on its street-facing sides by a low field-stone retaining wall capped in concrete  The house is a single story building with a shallow pitch roof that extend across a wraparound porch supported by Craftsan-style sloping square columns.  The gables are decorated with latticework and there are decorated viga-like rafter ends embellishing the area.  The building is roughly T-shaped, with three-part picture and casement window combinations at the front of the gable, and of the projecting side section.  It has been extended to the rear, with a period garage attached on the right rear.

The Albion Street area was largely farmland in the 19th century, and was part of a large rural tract that Wakefield annexed from Stoneham in 1880.  This house does not appear on a 1906 map of the area, which showed some development north of Albion Street.  From stylistic evidence, its construction date is estimated to be 1910.

See also
National Register of Historic Places listings in Wakefield, Massachusetts
National Register of Historic Places listings in Middlesex County, Massachusetts

References

Houses on the National Register of Historic Places in Wakefield, Massachusetts
Houses completed in 1910
Houses in Wakefield, Massachusetts